Banani may refer to:

People
 Bruno Banani (luger), a Tongan Olympian

Places
 Banani, Mali a village
 Banani Model Town, a neighbourhood of Dhaka, Bangladesh
 Banani Lake, Dhaka, Bangladesh

Other uses
 Bruno Banani, a German fashion company
 Banani International Secondary School, Chisamba, Zambia
 Banani railway station, Dhaka.

See also
 Al-Bannani (1727-1780) Moroccan Islamic jurist
 Banana (disambiguation)
 Banan (disambiguation)